Warren Noble may refer to:

 Warren P. Noble (1820–1903), U.S. Representative from Ohio
 Warren Noble (inventor) (1885–1950), British-born American automotive engineer and inventor